Clelia is a feminine given name derived from the Latin Cloelia, associated with the root of the verb cluere "to have renown, fame," and the name therefore means "illustrious, famous." In Roman legend Cloelia was a maiden who was given to an Etruscan invader as a hostage, but managed to escape by swimming across the Tiber.

People named Clelia
Clelia Barbieri (1847–1870), Italian Catholic saint
Clelia Grillo Borromeo (1684–1777), Italian mathematician, scientist, and countess
 Clelia Farnese (c.1556–1613), daughter of Cardinal Alessandro Farnese (1520-1589)
Clelia Durazzo Grimaldi (1760–1830), Italian botanist and marchesa
Clelia Haji-Ioannou (born 1970/1971), Cypriot billionaire
Clelia Matania (1918–1981), Italian actress
Clelia Duel Mosher (1863–1940), American hygienist and women's health advocate
Clelia Maria Josepha (Giuseppina) Strepponi (1815–1897), Italian operatic soprano, wife of Giuseppe Verdi
Lilian Mercedes Letona, known as Commander Clelia (1954–1983), Salvadoran guerrilla and revolutionary
Clelia Lollini (1890-1963), Italian medical doctor
Clelia Murphy (1975–) Irish actress

Fictional characters 
Clélia Conti, a character in the novel The Charterhouse of Parma by Stendhal
Clélia, a character played by Sophie Marceau in the film La Fidélité
Metastasio's libretto for "Il trionfo di Clelia" - opera set by Hasse, Gluck, and other composers
Clelia Waldgrave, a character in "The Nerd," a two-act comedy written by American actor/playwright Larry Shue

Notes

Italian feminine given names